The Great Stockholm Fire of 1625 was among the first known large scale fires in Stockholm prior to the city plan changes of the 17th-century. The fire began in the evening of September 1, 1625 in Kåkbrinken, and devastated the southwestern parts of Stadsholmen. It lasted three days and reportedly destroyed a fifth of the infrastructure of Stockholm at the time. The fire resulted in the building of a new city over the burnt areas, and a new tightened organisation of inspection of the fire prevention measures in the city.

Sources
 Linnea Forsberg (2001). ”Stora branden 1625”. Stormaktstidens Stockholm tar gestalt: gaturegleringen i Stockholm 1625-1650. Monografier utgivna av Stockholms stad, 0282-5899 ; 157. Stockholm: Stockholmia förlag. Libris 8369526. 

1625 disasters
17th-century fires
Urban fires in Europe
1625
17th century in Stockholm
1625 in Sweden
Fires in Stockholm